This is a list of the first qualified female physician to practice in each country, where that is known.  Many, if not all, countries have had female physicians since time immemorial; however, modern systems of qualification have often commenced as male only, whether de facto or de jure. This lists the first women physicians in modern countries. The dates given in parentheses below are the dates the women graduated from medical school.

Africa

Americas

Asia

 Nepal: Bethel Fleming (born in the U.S.) is considered the first Western female physician to practice in the country.

Europe

Oceania

See also
List of first female pharmacists by country
List of first women dentists by country
 Women in dentistry
Women in medicine

Notes

References

Physicians
.F
Physicians, Nationality
Physicians, Nationality
Physicians, Nationality
Women physicians